Arizona Proposition 207 may refer to one of the following:

2006 Arizona Proposition 207, concerning compensation for property value
2020 Arizona Proposition 207, concerning cannabis legalization